Cedarvale is an unincorporated community in Torrance County, New Mexico, United States. Cedarvale had a post office until it closed on May 15, 1990; it still has its own ZIP code, 87009.

References

Unincorporated communities in Torrance County, New Mexico
Unincorporated communities in New Mexico
Albuquerque metropolitan area